Colin Anderson (birth unknown) is a former professional rugby league footballer who played in the 1950s. He played at club level for Castleford (Heritage № 324), and the Featherstone Rovers (Heritage № 369).

Playing career

Club career
Colin Anderson made his début for the Featherstone Rovers on Saturday 7 April 1956, and he played his last match for the Featherstone Rovers during the 1957–58 season.

References

External links
Search for "Anderson" at rugbyleagueproject.org
Colin Anderson Memory Box Search at archive.castigersheritage.com

Living people
Castleford Tigers players
English rugby league players
Featherstone Rovers players
Place of birth missing (living people)
Year of birth missing (living people)